Pangasinan State University also referred to by its acronym PSU or (PangSU)) is a public university in Pangasinan province, Philippines. The university was founded in its current form in 1979, although its origins trace back to the 1920s. PSU is notable for its many locations throughout the province of Pangasinan. It is mandated to provide advanced instruction in the arts, agricultural and natural sciences as well as in technological and professional fields. Its main campus is located in Lingayen, Pangasinan. Other campuses are located in Alaminos, Asingan, Bayambang, Binmaley, Infanta, San Carlos City, Santa Maria, and Urdaneta City. The PSU School of Advanced Studies (SAS) is located in Urdaneta City and the Open University Systems (OUS) is located in Lingayen Campus.

History

Founding
The Pangasinan State University (PSU) was chartered by Presidential Decree No. 1497 promulgated on June 11, 1978. It became fully operational on July 1, 1979. The university is an integration of the college courses of six government-supported institutions in the province with the Central Luzon Teachers College (CLTC) as the only tertiary education component then. The Western Pangasinan College of Agriculture created through P.D. No. 1494 was also integrated although it was not yet operational at the time of integration. The Central Luzon Teachers College maintains laboratory units in the elementary and secondary levels.

Specifically, the college courses of the following schools were integrated into the new system:

 Asingan School of Arts and Trades (ASAT), Asingan
 Eastern Pangasinan Agricultural College (EPAC), Sta. Maria
 Pangasinan College of Fisheries (PCF), Binmaley
 Pangasinan School of Arts and Trades (PSAT), Lingayen
 Speaker Eugenio Perez National Agricultural School (SEPNAS), San Carlos City

Campuses
PSU System is composed of nine campuses, a graduate school and open university, located in different parts of Pangasinan

Campuses

Each campus of PSU is headed by a campus executive director.

 Pangasinan State University Alaminos
 Pangasinan State University Asingan
 Pangasinan State University Bayambang
 Pangasinan State University Binmaley
 Pangasinan State University Infanta
 Pangasinan State University Lingayen
 Pangasinan State University San Carlos City
 Pangasinan State University Santa Maria
 Pangasinan State University Urdaneta City

Additional Academic Units

Each unit is headed by an executive director. As of 2005, PSU is one of the ten universities offering the Open University System with six identified learning centers in the province of Pangasinan and has expanded its services in Region III and Visayas.

 PSU School for Advanced Studies
 PSU Open University Systems

Basic education

 Pangasinan State University Bayambang
Laboratory High School
Laboratory Elementary/Kindergarten
 Pangasinan State University Infanta
Laboratory High School

Organization

Board of Regents
PSU Board of Regents, composed of 12 members, is the highest decision-making body of the PSU system. It could be chaired by Commission on Higher Education chairman/commissioner. Other members are the president of the university, senate and house representatives, government representatives, private sector representatives, PSU Federated Alumni Association, PSU Federated Faculty Association, and PSU Federated Student Association representatives.

University President
PSU President is elected for a single term by the university's Board of Regents. The board can also choose to extend the term of the president based on substantial grounds and merits of the official's performance.

Lingayen (Main) Campus
Alvear Street, Lingayen, Pangasinan

PSU Lingayen Campus, as most Pangasinenses know it today, is the result of fusion of then six independent colleges in Lingayen namely the College of Arts, Sciences and Letters (CASL); College of Industrial Technology (CIT); College of Business and Public Administration (CBPA); College of Computing Sciences; College of Teacher Education (CTE); and College of Hospitality and Tourism Management (CHTM). Like other components of the Pangasinan State University (PSU), Main Campus has great transformation under the leadership of the University President.

Alaminos Campus

PSU Alaminos Campus, the ninth campus of PSU was conceptualized by City Mayor in a meeting with some PSU officials led by President Victoriano C. Estira.

The Sangguniang Panlungsod of Alaminos has favorably endorsed and approved the establishment of a campus of Pangasinan State University  in the City of Alaminos as contained in Resolution No. 2007-84, adopted on November 16, 2007. In 2008, the city has allocated a ten million (P10 M) budget for the first phase of construction of the PSU building.

Further, the PSU Alaminos Campus was approved by the PSU Board of Regents sitting en banc on April 19, 2009, at the University Hotel, University of the Philippines, Diliman, Quezon City as contained in its Resolution No. 04, series 2009. PSU Alaminos Campus was conceived with the principle that the National and Local Government have a shared responsibility of ensuring the happiness and well-being of the present generation brought about by a progressing economy and a well-developed society that exist within the wider context of the environment that requires the interaction among well-educated and value-driven citizens.

PSU highly enthused for the establishment of its ninth component Campus forged a collaborative partnership with the LGU of Alaminos to serve not only the constituents of the city but also the First District of Pangasinan and Northern Zambales. Hence, with the able leadership of President Victoriano C. Estira, PSU has established partnership with Hon. MARCELO E. NAVARRO JR., Municipal Mayor of Bani and signed a Memorandum of Agreement for the establishment of PSU Bani Extension College in Bani, Pangasinan as a satellite Campus on the May 4, 2009.

When the Academic Building (later named Purita R. A. Braganza Building) was finally completed, PSU Alaminos Campus, located in Barangay Bolaney in this city, has accepted enrollees since 2010.

Asingan Campus
Domanpot, Asingan, Pangasinan

The progress of education has been phenomenal as far as the development of colleges and universities of Pangasinan is concerned. In the mainstream of this development and growth, Pangasinan State University (PSU) – Asingan Campus stand up as a progressive college.

The campus history traces back in 1962 when PSU- College of Arts and Technology, Asingan Campus started as the Binalonan High School Annex situated in the school buildings of the defunct Pacifican Institute of Asingan. Later, the school site was acquired through a donation of the family of Concha Miguel. Temporary school buildings were constructed, so that in 1963, the school was separated from the Binalonan High School and became the Asingan High School by virtue of R.A. No. 3995 (Approved in 1967 and authored by Representative Luciano Millan). The school was later converted into Asingan School of Arts and Trades (ASAT) under the Bureau of Vocational Education. ASAT easily expanded with the offering of post secondary courses (Associate in Industrial Technology courses) and college degree programs like Bachelor in Industrial Technology (BIT) and Bachelor of Science in Industrial Education (BSIE).

Bayambang Campus
Zone VI, Poblacion, Bayambang, Pangasinan

The PSU Bayambang Campus had a very humble beginning. It started as the Bayambang Normal School in 1922. It offered then the secondary normal course which prepared much needed teachers for the country. The school closed in 1935 due to inadequate funds but re-opened in 1948 under a new name – the Pangasinan Normal School (PNS), which offered the two – year teacher education program. It was one among the first normal schools in the Philippines. It was in 1952 that the college offered the four – year degree in teacher education for elementary teachers by virtue of RA No. 975. In 1953, the school with elementary schools in the District of Bautista and the Bayambang National High School were merged to become the Philippine UNESCO Community Training Center. It operated as a school division then. Republic Act No. 5705 converted the school into a chartered institution – the then Central Luzon Teachers College in June 1969.

The Pangasinan State University Bayambang Campus is also among the constituent campuses of the university to actively house a Laboratory High School (a school under the College of Teacher Education; serves as training ground for future HS Teachers) which dates its history by its then – name, Central Luzon Teachers College. The Pangasinan State University Laboratory High School offers secondary education in Science Curriculum. The School also offered Basic Education Curriculum until March 2010. Batch 2010 – 2011 Seniors was the first batch of the school in years to graduate from an all – science curriculum enabled sectioning. It also was the first batch to graduate from an all – single section per year system which was decided upon dating back on 2007. The batch makes history in being the first batch to hold graduation rites in the first ever Integrated Closing Exercises which houses both the LHS and KD – ELS (Kindergarten Department – Elementary Laboratory School) in one Closing Ceremony. The Ceremony was successful, uniting the two laboratory schools of the Campus; KD – ELS and LHS.

Binmaley Campus
San Isidro Norte, Binmaley, Pangasinan

The Pangasinan State University (PSU) was created by virtue of Presidential Decree 1497 which was promulgated on June 11, 1978, and took effect on July 1, 1979. Starting its operation in 1979, it had two Colleges of Agriculture located in Sta. Maria and San Carlos City; two Colleges of Arts and Trades situated in Lingayen and Asingan; a College of Education in Bayambang; and a College of Fisheries in Binmaley. All the collegiate courses in the aforecited seven integrated component colleges of the university were government-supported and were directly under the supervision of then Department of Education, Culture and Sports (DECS).

Infanta Campus
Bamban, Infanta, Pangasinan

The College of Agriculture in Infanta, Pangasinan was created by PD 1494 signed by President Marcos on June 11, 1978. On the same day, PD 1497 was signed by the President, establishing the Pangasinan State University (PSU) which integrated the college level courses of the seven state-funded institutions in Pangasinan, one of which is the College of Agriculture in Infanta.

The PSU became officially operational on July 1, 1979, but the college in Infanta had no budgetary allocation. However, funds from the PSU Main were set aside to prepare for its opening in June 1981.

President Marcos proclaimed 1000 hectares in Barangay Bamban, Infanta for the college site. A portion of the site had been prepared for the College Campus. Concerned leaders of Pangasinan helped in the preparations, among whom are: Hon. Jacobo C. Clave, Vice Governor of Pangasinan (Formerly Presidential Executive Assistant), Governor Aguedo F. Agbayani and the members of the Sangguniang Panlalawigan; the Honorable Assemblymen of Pangasinan; Mayor Cesar F. Vallarta and the members of the Sangguniang Bayan of Infanta, including the Barangay Officials of Bamban and nearby barangays.

Director Benjamin Mercado of the Ministry of Budget, Region I and his staff with PSU officials visited the site in early 1980 and recommended (and finally approved) the construction of one Administration Building, Farm Machinery Building, and Agricultural Building and a water tank in 1981 to start the educational institution in Western Pangasinan and nearby Zambales to serve the educational needs of the youth.

The PSU Infanta Campus became fully operational in June 1981 and earned its autonomous status in January 1983. The college campus in Bamban, Infanta has a wide agricultural and forest reserves which serve as training ground and laboratory of the students and all agencies committed to development. It is about 7.5 km. from the town proper and located near San Felipe River, the National Irrigation Administration (NIA) dam, and the white clay mines.

San Carlos Campus
Roxas Boulevard, San Carlos City, Pangasinan

PSU San Carlos Campus was among the first campuses established in the PSU System by virtue of Presidential Decree No. 1497 which was promulgated on June 11, 1978. It started as the College Department of the Speaker Eugenio Perez National Agricultural School (SEPNAS) and pioneered the offering of a two-year course in Associate in Agricultural technology (AAT) in 1974, which was a crash program of the Ministry of Education, Culture and Sports. In 1976, the four-year Bachelor of Science in Agricultural Education (BSAEd) program was offered.

Sta Maria Campus
Cuangao, Sta. Maria, Pangasinan

On June 13, 1978, Congressman Luciano Millan of the fifth (now sixth) Congressional District of Pangasinan worked for the enhancement of R.A. 2430 authorizing the appropriation of P200, 000 for the establishment, operation and maintenance of the Eastern Pangasinan National Agricultural School (EPNAS) in Sta. Maria, Pangasinan. After six years of operation, EPNAS was converted into a college with the enactment of RA 4178 known as the Eastern Pangasinan Agricultural College (EPAC).
On June 13, 1978, Congressman Luciano Millan of the 5th (now 6th) Congressional District of Pangasinan worked for the enhancement of R.A. 2430 authorizing the appropriation of P200, 000 for the establishment, operation and maintenance of the Eastern Pangasinan National Agricultural School (EPNAS) in Sta. Maria, Pangasinan. After six years of operation, EPNAS was converted into a college with the enactment of RA 4178 known as the Eastern Pangasinan Agricultural College (EPAC).
Courses offered then where Bachelor of Science in agriculture (BSA major in Agronomy and Animal Husbandry; and the two-year Associate in Agricultural Technology (AAT).

On June 11, 1978, some members of the faculty and staff, facilities and equipment, and a number of buildings were formally and legally integrated to the Pangasinan State University (PSU) system by virtue of PD 1497 in the school year 1979–80 and thus became PSU-Sta. Maria (PSU-SM). The college offered degrees in Bachelor of Science in Agriculture majors in Animal Husbandry, Crop Science, Agricultural Education, Agriculture Economics and Agricultural Extension.

Urdaneta Campus
San Vicente, Urdaneta City, Pangasinan

Pangasinan State University Urdaneta is situated in the melting pot and fast-growing education center in Urdaneta City, Pangasinan.
It primarily offers programs in engineering and in education.

PSU School of Advanced Studies
San Vicente, Urdaneta City, Pangasinan
The School of Advanced Studies originated from the programs of the then Central Luzon Teachers College. The now PSU-Bayambang Campus had a humble beginning. It started as the Bayambang Normal School in 1922, folded up in the thirties due to world-wide economic crisis, re-opened and renamed Pangasinan Normal School (PNS) in 1948. In 1953, it became a part of the Philippine – UNESCO National Community Training Center (PUNCTC). From a two-year (ETC) collegiate institution, it offered the four-year teacher education program in 1954 by virtue of RA No. 975. In 1961, its graduate program was opened. In 1969, the school was chartered through RA No. 5705 to be known as the Central Luzon Teachers College.

In 1978 by virtue of the issuance of P.D. No. 4197, the Pangasinan State University was created. In 1982, the doctoral program of the university was offered. PSU-Bayambang Campus, with its teacher education program, was made the center. In 1987, there were four centers of the Graduate School located at PSU-Bayambang, PSU-Lingayen, PSU-Sta. Maria, and PSU-Urdaneta, with the latter as its central office. The following year, the master's program of PSU-Sta. Maria was transferred to PSU-Urdaneta. Thus, there were three centers in 1988 to 1994. In 1994, all graduate programs were centralized in PSU-Graduate School – Urdaneta City.

PSU Open University System
Alvear Street, Lingayen, Pangasinan

The Pangasinan State University established the Open University System in the latter part of the year 1996. It was formally launched at PSU-Lingayen in March 1997 with the presence of former Speaker Jose de Venecia, Jr. who was instrumental in the funding of the initial two years of operation of the system. The establishment of the PSU-OUS was borne out of the need to respond to the unique needs for further professional and technical development of career people, administrators and managers, technicians and workers who may not have the time or opportunity to attend or perform the regular university programs while at work.

Recognition
 PSU is authorized and chartered by the Commission on Higher Education, Department of Education 
 PSU is accredited by AACCUP (Accrediting Agency of Chartered Colleges and Universities in the Philippines). 
 Since AACCUP is a member of APQN (Asia-Pacific Qualifying Network), PSU's programs are recognized by Asia Pacific nations. (Malaysia Qualifying Agency, MQA, is also a member of APQN). (See www.apqn.org)
 In addition, APQN is a member of INQAAHE (International Network for Quality Assurance Agencies in Higher Education), as such PSU's programs are recognized worldwide.

Accreditation

AACCUP Accreditation

THE AGENCY FOR ACCREDITATION

The accreditation of curricular programs in the Philippines, particularly for state universities and colleges, is the main function of the Accrediting Agency of Chartered Colleges and Universities in the Philippines (AACCUP), Inc. Organized in 1987, though officially registered and recognized under the Securities and Exchange Commission (SEC) on September 4, 1989, it is the youngest of the four (4) accrediting agencies in the country until late 2003. Under its charter, one of the functions, if not the main purpose of AACCUP, is "to develop a mechanism of, and conduct the evaluation of programs and institutions."

AACCUP is now closely allied with the Association of Local Colleges and Universities Commission on Accreditation, Inc. (ALCUCOA), organized only in the later part of year 2003.

The AACCUP is a member of the:

 National Network of Quality Assurance Agencies, Inc. (NNQAA),formed by AACCUP and the Association of Local Colleges and Universities Commission on Accreditation, Inc. (ALCUCOA).
 Asia-Pacific Quality Network (APQN) with AACCUP as member of the Steering Group based in Hong Kong, China.
 International Network of Quality Assurance Agencies in Higher Education (INQAAHE) based in The Hague, The Netherlands.

'''Assessed Programs – All Years as of December 31, 2011,
Pangasinan State University (PSU) Lingayen, Pangasinan

ISO CERTIFICATION 
PSU is awarded by AJA Registrars the ISO 9001:2015. In 2016, PSU was cited as the first SUC in the Philippines to have ISO 9001:2015 certification. In 2017, PSU became a Multi-Campus ISO Certified.

Notable alumni
List of Pangasinan State University Notable Alumni

 Gov. Amado  Totaan Espino Jr., Governor of Pangasinan
 Dr. Virgilio U. Manzano, UNESCO-Chair for the Scientific Literacy Training Program at Hiroshima University.

References

External links
Information Page
Home page

Universities and colleges in Pangasinan
State universities and colleges in the Philippines
Establishments by Philippine presidential decree